Touring Club Belgium (TCB) is a motoring organisation providing roadside assistance, insurance, medical insurance and legal support throughout Belgium.  TCB is a member of the FIA and ARCEurope.

Research
As well as being an active automobile association TCB also undertakes road safety research.

EuroRAP in Belgium
TCB is the active member for the European Road Assessment Programme (EuroRAP) in Belgium.  TCB regularly publishes maps showing the risk of being involved in an accident.

Campaigning for Safe Road Design
The European Campaign for Safe Road Design is a partnership between 28 major European road safety stakeholders that is calling for the EC to invest in safe road infrastructure initiatives which could cut deaths on European roads by 33% in less than a decade.  TCB is the campaign's partner in Belgium.

See also
 EuroRAP
 Campaign for Safe Road Design

References

Automobile associations
Road safety
Clubs and societies in Belgium